A lifeform is a type of thing that is living or alive.

Lifeform or Lifeforms may also refer to:
 Lifeforms (The Future Sound of London album)
 "Lifeforms" (song), by the Future Sound of London from Lifeforms
 Lifeforms (Angels & Airwaves album)
 Lifeform (comics), a character in the Marvel Comics Universe
 Life Form (novel), a 2010 novel by Amélie Nothomb
 Plant life-form, systems for categorizing plants
 Raunkiær plant life-form, a system for categorizing plants by Christen C. Raunkiær

See also
 Carbon-based life
 Carbon Based Lifeforms, a Swedish music group
 Form of life (philosophy)
 Life
 List of life forms
 Non-Intentional Lifeform or N.I.L., an Australian band
 Organism
 Silicon-based life